Shah of Shahs is a 1982 non-fiction book by Polish journalist Ryszard Kapuściński. It is his analysis of the decline and fall of Mohammad Reza Pahlavi, the last Shah of Iran.

References

1982 non-fiction books
Books by Ryszard Kapuściński
Polish non-fiction books
Czytelnik books
Books about Mohammad Reza Pahlavi
Books about the Iranian Revolution
Books about coups d'état